SECIS-binding protein 2 (commonly referred to as SBP2) is a protein that in humans is encoded by the SECISBP2 gene.

Function 

The incorporation of selenocysteine into a protein requires the concerted action of an mRNA element called a sec insertion sequence (SECIS), a selenocysteine-specific translation elongation factor and a SECIS binding protein. With these elements in place, a UGA codon can be decoded as selenocysteine. SBP2 is a nuclear protein that functions as a SECIS binding protein, but experimental evidence indicates that SBP2 is cytoplasmic.

Clinical significance 

Mutations in this gene have been associated with a reduction in activity of a specific thyroxine deiodinase, a selenocysteine-containing enzyme, and abnormal thyroid hormone metabolism.

See also 
 Thyroid hormone resistance

References

Further reading 

 
 
 
 
 
 
 
 
 
 
 

Selenoproteins